Better Dayz is the eighth studio album and fourth posthumous album by the late American rapper 2Pac, and is his last to be a double-album.

It was released on November 26, 2002, debuting at number five on the US Billboard 200. This album is the second of two albums (the first being Until the End of Time) that consists of a collection of previously unreleased material by way of remixed songs from Tupac's "Makaveli" period while signed to Death Row Records, and was produced by Johnny "J", Jazze Pha, Frank Nitty, and E.D.I. Mean of Outlawz. It includes "Military Minds" which features Boot Camp Clik members Buckshot and Smif-n-Wessun (credited as Cocoa Brovaz) which was supposed to be part of a collaborative album between Shakur and BCC titled One Nation but was never officially released due to Shakur's death. Better Dayz has no censored references to Death Row Records unlike the previous album, Until the End of Time. The only track on the album pre-Death Row era is "My Block (Remix)", which was recorded in 1994–1995 during Shakur's time with Interscope Records, and which the original version can be found on The Show. The song ‘’Late Night’’ featuring DJ Quik, has been removed from all digital versions of the album for an unknown reason.

The album features appearances by Outlawz, Ron Isley, Nas, Mýa, Jazze Pha and Tyrese, among others. The hit single, "Thugz Mansion," comes in two versions: an acoustic version featuring Nas and J. Phoenix, on which the music video is based, and a hip hop version featuring Anthony Hamilton.

Recording
It features unreleased recordings from the 1994–1996 period, the majority of which are remixed mainly between Thug Life Volume 1 & The Don Killuminati: The 7 Day Theory. Others retain their original form or are complete finished mixes, such as "Fuck 'Em All", "Late Night", "Ghetto Star", "Better Dayz", "Who Do U Believe In?" and "They Don't Give a Fuck About Us".

Critical reception

John Bush from AllMusic wrote: "Better Dayz shouldn't be overlooked [...] A lengthy two-disc set, it benefits from a raft of still-compelling material by one of the two or three best rappers in history, as well as excellent compiling by executive producers Suge Knight and Afeni Shakur, 2Pac's mother. Organizing the set roughly into one disc of hardcore rap and one of R&B jams makes for an easier listen, and the R&B disc especially has some strong tracks, opening with a remix of 1995's 'My Block' and including quintessentially 2Pac material—reflective, conflicted, occasionally anguished—like 'Never Call U Bitch Again,' 'Better Dayz,' 'Fame,' and 'This Life I Lead.' [...] It's 2Pac's best album since his death." Kludge magazine included it on their list of best albums of 2002. The track "Ghetto Star" has appeared on the soundtrack to the video game 25 To Life.

Commercial performance
Better Dayz debuted at number five on the US Billboard 200 chart, selling 366,000 copies in its first week. This became 2Pac's eighth US top-ten album. In its second week, the album dropped to number eight on the chart, selling an additional 163,000 copies. As of September 2011, the album has sold 1,765,597 copies in the United States. On July 23, 2014, the album was certified triple platinum by the Recording Industry Association of America (RIAA) for sales of over three million copies.

In May 2003, the album was also certified triple platinum in Canada for sales of over 300,000 copies in Canada.

Track listing

Samples
 "Better Dayz"
 "Let's Fall in Love (Parts 1 & 2)" by The Isley Brothers
 "Catchin' Feelins"
 "Peter Piper" by Run-DMC
 "Late Night"
 "Have Your Ass Home by 11:00" by Richard Pryor
 "Wind Parade" by Donald Byrd
 "Last Night Changed It All (I Really Had a Ball)" by Esther Williams
 "This Life I Lead"
 "Naturally Mine" by Al B. Sure!
 "Who Do U Believe In"
 "Manifest Destiny" by Jamiroquai

Personnel

 2Pac – vocals
 Johnta Austin – featured artist
 Rob "Fonksta" Bacon – guest artist, guitar
 Bill Bennett – assistant engineer
 Big Syke – featured artist
 Ian Blanch – assistant engineer, engineer
 Warren Bletcher – assistant engineer
 Ian Boxill – engineer, mixing
 Leslie Brathwaite – engineer, mixing
 Briss – instrumentation, producer
 Buckshot – featured artist
 Coco Brothers – featured artist
 Courtney Copeland – background vocals
 Kevin Crouse – engineer
 Claudio Cueni – digital editing, engineer, mixing, producer
 Chris DeLaPena – assistant engineer
 DJ Quik – engineer, producer
 E.D.I. – featured artist, mixing, Music Supervisor, remixing
 Steve Fisher – assistant engineer
 Nanci Fletcher - featured artist
 G Mack – guitar
 Brian "Big bass" Gardner – mastering
 A. Gobi – photography
 Anthony Hamilton – featured artist
 Darryl Harper – producer
 Kimmy Hill – featured artist
 Ronald Isley – guest artist
 Jazze Pha – featured artist, producer
 Johnny J – arranger, mixing, producer
 Troy Johnson – instrumentation, producer
 Kadafi – featured artist
 Kastro – performer
 Ronnie King – keyboards
 Suge Knight – executive producer
 Mr. Biggs – featured artist
 Chicu Modu – photography
 Molly Monjauze – project director
 Mussamill – featured artist
 James Musshorn – assistant engineer
 Mya – featured artist
 Napoleon – featured artist
 Nas – featured artist
 Duane Nettlesbey –
 Nutso – featured artist
 Outlawz – featured artist
 J. Phoenix – featured artist,
 Frank Nitty Pimentel – drum programming, Keyboards, producer
 Will Pyon – digital editing
 Chuck Reed – digital editing
 R.J. – bass, guitar
 7 Aurelius – instrumentation, producer
 Afeni Shakur – executive producer
 Shorty B. – bass, guitar
 Dexter Simmons – mixing
 Alex Stiff – bass, guitar
 T.I. – featured artist
 Ellis Taylor – background vocals
 Trick Daddy – featured artist
 Tyrese – featured artist
 Mark Vinten – assistant engineer
 Corey Williams – assistant engineer
 Dwight DeLemond Williams - featured artist
 Jasmine Wilson – background vocals
 Keston Wright – engineer
 Young Noble – featured artist

Charts

Weekly charts

Year-end charts

Certifications

See also
 List of number-one R&B albums of 2002 (U.S.)

References

2002 albums
Tupac Shakur albums
Albums published posthumously
Albums produced by E.D.I.
Albums produced by Daz Dillinger
Albums produced by DJ Quik
Albums produced by Johnny "J"
Death Row Records albums